Nematopogon swammerdamella is a moth of the family Adelidae.

Description
The moth has long, pale shining ochreous, faintly darker strigulated forewings and long antennae. The hindwings are pale grey; cilia whitish-ochreous. Head orange, face whitish. The wingspan is 17–21 mm.

The moth flies from late April to June. The moth is only active in the late afternoon and dusk. Nematopogon schwarziellus, Nematopogon pilella, and Nematopogon metaxella are similar to this species.

Habitat and range
It is found throughout most of Europe, except the Balkan Peninsula, Greece, Iceland and Ukraine. It can commonly be found throughout the British Isles in woodland. The species has also been known to live in hedgerows, moorland, heathland, and other open habitats.

Caterpillars
The caterpillars feed on decaying plant matter and various herbaceous plants. Older caterpillars live in a bivalved case on the ground. They hibernate twice and pupate inside the case.

Etymology
The name honours the Dutch scientist Jan Swammerdam.

References

External links

 waarneming.nl 
 Lepidoptera of Belgium
 Nematopogon swammerdamella at UKmoths
 Fauna Europaea
 Images representing Nematopogon swammerdamella at Consortium for the Barcode of Life

Adelidae
Moths described in 1758
Taxa named by Carl Linnaeus
Moths of Europe
Moths of Asia